Lysinibacillus endophyticus is a Gram-positive, aerobic and rod-shaped bacterium from the genus of Lysinibacillus which has been isolated from the root of a maize plant. Lysinibacillus endophyticus produces indole-3-acetic acid.

References

Bacillaceae
Bacteria described in 2017